Vladimir Pavlovich Polevanov (born 11 November 1949, Kharkov, Ukrainian SSR, USSR) is a former Russian politician who served as a Deputy Chairman of Government of the Russian Federation during the administration of President Boris Yeltsin. He was also chairman of the State Property Committee and governor of the Amur Oblast.

In government
Originally he had been the governor of the Amur Oblast (1993–1994) who had supported Yeltsin during the 1993 Russian constitutional crisis. The fall of the Russian ruble against the dollar in October 1994 brought about a shakeup in Yeltsin's economic team. Polevanov was recommended by Anatoly Chubais, although he was originally a geologist by profession. He was appointed Deputy Prime Minister of Russia and chairman of the State Property Committee (Russia's privatization agency) on 15 November 1994. Polevanov was removed from those positions on 24 January 1995 after advocating for the re-nationalization of certain sectors after their "improper privatization," including energy and defense; objecting to the influence of foreign investment; and barring Western advisors from the Committee, to protect national secrets. In effect, Polevanov was criticized for being against privatizing key sectors of the economy, which he believed was threat to national security–something that damaged the confidence of foreign investors. This cooled his relations with Chubais, who later engineered his removal from the post.

Sources

Notes

Books
 
 
 
 

1949 births
20th-century Russian politicians
Politicians from Kharkiv
Governors of Amur Oblast
Government ministers of Russia
Deputy heads of government of the Russian Federation
Russian geologists
Living people